Keivan Amraei, born on February 11, 1986, Iran, is an Iranian footballer. He currently plays for Pars Jonoubi in Persian Gulf Pro League. He usually plays as a striker. He was under suspension for illegal use of his cousin's identity documents for two years.

Club career
A product of the Zob Ahan youth system, Amraei was drafted into the first team for the IPL 2006/07 season and at the age of 16 proved to be a success, becoming an influential member of Zob Ahan's attack alongside experienced national side player Mehdi Rajabzadeh. He had a good season after that but in 2008–09 season he was mostly injured which forced him out of the squad most of the times.

Club career statistics
Last Update: 1 August 2014

 Assist Goals

International career
Amraei was called up to the Iran national under-23 football team qualifying squad for the 2008 Beijing Olympics.

References

External links
Amraei YouTube Compilation

Iranian footballers
Association football forwards
Zob Ahan Esfahan F.C. players
Sanat Mes Kerman F.C. players
Shahr Khodro F.C. players
Sportspeople from Isfahan
1986 births
Living people
People from Kuhdasht